Morriss Murphey Henry (born December 13, 1931) is a former American politician. He was a Democratic member of the Arkansas House of Representatives and Arkansas State Senate from the years of 1967 to 1984. Educated at Hendrix College, the University of Tennessee, and Harvard University, he is an ophthalmologist.

References

Living people
Democratic Party members of the Arkansas House of Representatives
1931 births
Democratic Party Arkansas state senators
University of Tennessee alumni
Politicians from Cincinnati
American optometrists
Harvard University alumni
Hendrix College alumni